Chaiyaphum is a town (thesaban mueang) in northeastern Thailand, capital of Chaiyaphum Province.  it had a population of 58,350, and covers the full tambon Nai Mueang of Mueang Chaiyaphum District. Chaiyaphum is 337 road kilometres northeast of Bangkok.

As of 2021, there are wild elephants in the town.

Geography
Chaiyaphum lies on the Khorat plateau at  elevation. The land in the immediate vicinity of the city is flat, but the Phetchabun Mountains rise to the west.

Climate
Chaiyaphum has a tropical savanna climate (Köppen climate classification Aw). Winters are dry and warm. The monsoon season runs from late April through October, with heavy rain and somewhat cooler temperatures during the day, although nights remain warm.

Transportation
Route 201 begins in Chum Phae, and runs past Chaiyaphum (without actually entering the town) to Mittraphap near Sikhio. Route 202 leads east to Yasothon, Amnat Charoen, and the border with Laos at Khemarat. Route 225 leads west to Nakhon Sawan.

References

External links

Populated places in Chaiyaphum province
Cities and towns in Thailand
Isan